Daniela Nane (born November 29, 1971) is a Romanian actress and director. She was the Miss Romania in 1991 and was the first contestant from Romania in the Miss Universe pageant (1992).

Early life and education
Nane was born in Iași, Romania, on November 29, 1971. In 1994, she attended a masterclass at the European League of Institutes of the Arts. Later, in 2011, she participated in a training course in "Japanese Culture and Civilization and Japanese Theater" at Osaka University through the UNESCO Chair.

Career
Nane stepped into the spotlight in 1991, when she won the Miss Romania pageant and a year later, she became Romania's first participant in the Miss Universe beauty pageant held in Las Vegas. Afterward, from 1991 to 1995, she attended the Caragiale National University of Theatre and Film, where she studied with instructors like Mircea Albulescu, Cătălin Naum, and Adrian Titieni. 

Nane is also an artistic director of the Musical Theater Ambasadorii. She has starred in more than 50 theatrical plays, feature films, and television shows during her career. In 2021, she debuted as a director with a comedy play on Broadway, filmed in Vâlcea.

Personal life
Until 2002, Nane was married to a businessman Viorel Popa with whom she had a child, Codrin. After her divorce, she was in a relationship with the director Andrei Zincă for some time. Later in 2016, she married Adrian Cioroianu, the former minister of foreign affairs.

Awards
Nane won two best actress awards for her debut in Patul lui Procust, directed by Cătăline Buzoianu.

Filmography
 Eu sunt Adam (My Name Is Adam - 1996) - Oana
 Femeia în roșu (The Woman in Red) (1997)
 Dublu extaz (Double Ecstasy) (1998)
 Epicentru (Epicenter) (2000)
 La Bloc (The Block) (2003) - Monica
 În extrasezon (In the off-season) (2004) - Suburban Mom
 Orient Express (2004) - Carmen Ionescu
 Aripile întunericului (Wings of Darkness) (2004) - The Girl
 O secundă de ură (A Second of Hate) (2004) - Ana
 Căsătorie imposibilă (Impossible Marriage) (TV Series - 2004)
 Prințesa vampirilor (Vampire Princess) ( BloodRayne - 2005) - Rayne's mother
 "15" (2005) - Nina
  La urgență (In the Emergency) (TV series, 2006)
  Happy End (2006) - Dana's mother
  Dincolo de America (Beyond America) (2008) - Milena Savian
  Dragoste pierdută (Lost Love) (2008)
  17 - O poveste despre destin (17 - A Story About Destiny) (TV Series, 2008)

References

External links
 Daniela Nane at IMDb

1971 births
Living people
Romanian beauty pageant winners
Miss Universe 1991 contestants
Romanian film actresses
Romanian television personalities
Actors from Iași
20th-century Romanian actresses